Marion Becker ( Steiner, January 21, 1950) is a German athlete who competed mainly in the javelin throw.

Biography
She competed in the women's javelin throw at the 1972 Summer Olympics, representing Romania.

References 

1950 births
Living people
Romanian female javelin throwers
West German female javelin throwers
Olympic silver medalists for West Germany
Athletes (track and field) at the 1972 Summer Olympics
Athletes (track and field) at the 1976 Summer Olympics
Olympic athletes of Romania
Olympic athletes of West Germany
Medalists at the 1976 Summer Olympics
Olympic silver medalists in athletics (track and field)